Gaius Asinius Frugi (born c. 80), was a Roman moneyer who was officially permitted to mint money for use in Phrygia between 98 and 116. He was probably a descendant of Nicomachus (c. 30 BC - aft. 1 BC), a notable of Lydia in 1 BC.

He married and probably was the father of Gaius Asinius Rufus (c. 110 - after 136), who was also a notable in Lydia in 134 and 135 and became a Roman Senator in 136, and who married Julia, daughter of A. Julius Claudius Charax (c. 115 - after 147), granddaughter of G. Julius Lupus T. Vibius Varus Laevillus (c. 95 - after 132) and wife Julia Quadratilla  and through her great-granddaughter of Gaius Julius Quadratus Bassus, suffect consul in 105, and wife Julia, Princess of Cilicia  and had issue.

Sources
 Christian Settipani, Continuite Gentilice et Continuite Familiale Dans Les Familles Senatoriales Romaines, A L'Epoque Imperiale, Mythe et Realite. Linacre, UK: Prosopographica et Genealogica, 2000. ILL. NYPL ASY (Rome) 03-983.

1st-century Romans
2nd-century Romans
Frugy, Gaius
Year of birth unknown
Year of death unknown